137th meridian may refer to:

137th  meridian east, a line of longitude east of the Greenwich Meridian
137th meridian west, a line of longitude west of the Greenwich Meridian